Mark Christian Thompson (born c. 1970) is an American academic who is Krieger-Eisenhower Professor and Professor of English at Johns Hopkins University in Baltimore, Maryland. His research focuses on African American literature and philosophy, as well as German philosophy and jazz studies.

Early life and education
Thompson was born in New York City and speaks fluent German and French. He is the son of an African American father and a mother immigrated from Sicily. He studied art history as an undergraduate at the University of Virginia, graduating in 1993. He then completed both a Masters and a PhD in comparative literature at New York University, with a 2001 thesis titled Savage Modernism: Blood-sacrifice, Literary Primitivism and Culture.

Career
Thompson was an Assistant Professor of English at the University of Illinois, Urbana-Champaign from 2001 to 2009. In 2007, he was awarded a Fulbright Scholar grant to lecture at Charles University in Prague on "the aesthetics of blackness".

Thompson started at Johns Hopkins University in 2010 as an Associate Professor English and was made Professor in 2016 and chair of the department in 2018. At Johns Hopkins, Thompson teaches courses including "The Philosophy of African American Literature; African American Literary Theory and Criticism"; "Modernism and Sacrifice; The Body, Space, and Modernity in Nineteenth-Century Fiction"; "African American Literature: The Beginnings to 1914"; "Slave Narratives and Neo-Slave Narratives"; "The Gothic Novel"; "The Bible as Literature"; and "Introduction to Literary Study".

Thompson's first book, Black Fascisms: African American Literature and Culture Between the Wars, was published in 2007, and addresses the fact that many African American intellectuals in the 1930s sympathized with fascism. Thompson argues these tendencies were more than merely a response to events in Germany and Italy but an "organise feature of the evolution of blackness." His 2016 book, Kafka’s Blues: Figurations of Racial Blackness in the Construction of an Aesthetic, deconstructs Kafka through the lens of race and argues that many of his major works engage in a "coherent, sustained meditation on racial blackness",

In 2018, Thompson published Anti-Music: Jazz and Racial Blackness in German Thought between the Wars, examining writings by Hermann Hesse, Bertolt Brecht, T.W. Adorno, and Klaus Mann, to look at the topic of jazz in the Weimar Republic and Nazi Germany using a "symptomatic textual reading" to examine attitudes.

Thompson's 2022 book, Black Power, Philosophy, and Theory "examines the changing interdisciplinary investments of key mid-century Black writers and thinkers" and places Black Power in a philosophical context.

Thompson has commented in the media on the Trump administration, the meaning of United States legal institutions such as the filibuster and the Electoral College, as well as police reform and racial profiling.

Selected publications

Books

Chapters and articles

References

External links
 Official website

1970 births
Living people
Johns Hopkins University faculty